Jeram is a town and mukim in Kuala Selangor District, Selangor, Malaysia.

It is about halfway between Kapar and Kuala Selangor, on Highway 5.

References

Kuala Selangor District
Mukims of Selangor